Donuts is the second studio album by the American hip hop producer J Dilla, released on February 7, 2006, by Stones Throw Records. It was released on the day of his 32nd birthday, three days before his death.

The album was recorded in 2005, largely during J Dilla's extended stay at Cedars-Sinai Medical Center due to complications from thrombotic thrombocytopenic purpura (TTP) and lupus. Twenty-nine of the album's thirty-one tracks were recorded in J Dilla's hospital room, using a 45-rpm record player and a Boss SP-303 sampler.

Donuts received widespread critical acclaim for its dense, eclectic sampling and its perceived confrontation of mortality. Pitchfork placed the album at number 38 on their list of the top 50 albums of 2006 and at number 66 on their list of the top 200 albums of the 2000s. In 2020, Rolling Stone ranked the album at 386 in their 500 Greatest Albums of All Time. It is regarded, by fans and critics alike, as J Dilla's magnum opus, a classic of instrumental hip hop, and one of the most influential hip hop albums of all time, with artists of many genres citing it as an inspiration.

Background
In 2002, J Dilla had been diagnosed with thrombotic thrombocytopenic purpura, an incurable disease of the blood, while also battling lupus, which had been diagnosed a year previously. According to close friend and fellow producer Karriem Riggins, the impetus for Donuts came during an extended hospital stay in the summer of 2005.

In his last interview, which was granted to Scratch Magazine in November 2005, Dilla briefly spoke about the creation of the album:

In the December 2006 issue of The Fader, J Dilla's mother Maureen Yancey, a former opera singer, spoke of watching her son's daily routine during the making of Donuts:

Composition
Donuts is an instrumental hip hop album; the only lyrics on it are short phrases and gasps taken from various records. Donuts contains 31 tracks, which was J Dilla's age at the time of recording. Most songs are quite short, running at lengths of 1–1.5 minutes each, and vary in style and tone. Clash called the album "a conversation between two completely different producers". The original press release for the album compared it to scanning radio stations in an unfamiliar city.

The track order is also unusual: the album begins with an outro and ends with the intro. According to Collin Robinson of Stereogum, "it's almost too perfect a metaphor for Dilla's otherworldly ability to flip the utter shit out of anything he sampled". The ending of the final track flows right into the beginning of the first one, forming an infinite loop, and alluding to donuts' circular form.

Recording
In 2005, J Dilla underwent treatment at Cedars-Sinai Medical Center for complications brought on by TTP and a form of lupus. While in the hospital, he worked on two albums: Donuts and The Shining. 29 out of 31 tracks from Donuts were recorded in hospital, using a Boss SP-303 sampler and a Numark PT-01 record player his friends brought him. Records his mother and friends would bring were used as the source of the samples for the album. She recalled it in the Crate Diggers documentary: "When I took the crate up, and he looked through it, I think out of a whole milk crate full of 45s, I think he might have taken a dozen out of there and set them aside. He said 'you can take that back to the house'. He said 'none of that's good'."

Throughout the year his condition worsened. His legs swelled, making it difficult to walk. At times his hands swelled so much he could barely move them. If the pain was too intense, his mother would massage his fingertips, so he could continue working on the album. Occasionally he would wake up in the middle of the night and ask his mother to move him from his bed to the instruments. According to Kelley L. Carter of Detroit Free Press, J Dilla told his doctor he was proud of the work, and that all he wanted to do was to finish the album.

While working on the album, Dilla didn't allow anyone to listen to the unfinished version and was furious when he found out his mother listened to it while he was in dialysis.

Release and promotion
Donuts was ready to be released by October 2005, but according to Stones Throw, their distributor, EMI, "didn't think a weird, difficult instrumental album by an underground producer would move the projected 10,000 copies", since Dilla's previous album, Champion Sound, failed to achieve commercial success. Later the label came to an understanding with the distributor and the album was set for release in early February 2006, along with a bonus single "Signs".

Donuts was released on February 7, 2006, J Dilla's 32nd birthday. To celebrate this, his friends, Madlib, Peanut Butter Wolf, Egon, and J Rocc, visited his house. Although J Dilla was generally energetic despite his health condition, he was mumbling and gesturing weakly during that day. Three days later, on February 10, 2006, he died at his home in Los Angeles, California. According to his mother, the cause was cardiac arrest.

The album's cover was designed by Stones Throw art director, Jeff Jank. Due to the state of Dilla's health at the time, it was not possible to compose a new photo for the album's cover. Instead, a photo from some raw footage of Dilla hanging out at MED's video shoot for his single, "Push" was used. The raw footage was submitted from director Andrew Gura to Jeff Jank. Seeing the photo, Maureen Yancey stated that she thought this photo perfectly captured her son's spirit. The album's title came from J Dilla's personal fondness for donuts.

Dilla's death, three days after the album's release, was widely mourned by the hip hop community, including all those who worked with him in the past and the years closer to his death, especially Detroit's hip-hop community (which included rapper Proof, a friend and associate of Dilla's, who died soon after Dilla).

Donuts: J Rocc's Picks

To promote the album, Stones Throw, in association with Guitar Center and Adult Swim, released a limited edition EP called Donuts EP: J. Rocc's Picks. The EP contained five extended versions of Donuts instrumentals and the bonus track, "Signs". Copies of the EP were given away on Winter Music Conference (WMC) 2006 and South by Southwest (SXSW) 2006. The label later started selling digital versions of the EP on their official site.

Rereleases
In January 2013, the album was rereleased as a box set. Apart from seven 7-inch vinyl records it contained a bonus 7-inch with tracks "Signs" and "Sniper Elite & Murder Goons", featuring MF Doom and Ghostface Killah. A number of music journalists criticized the box set, stating that the album should be listened as a whole and shouldn't be split.

On September 27, 2014, Donuts was released on compact cassettes, as a part of Cassette Store Day.

In February 2016, on Donutss 10th anniversary, LP version of the album was rereleased. It included the original cover art with Jeff Jank's drawing on it, new drawing on the back, and liner notes by Jordan Ferguson, containing an excerpt from his book Donuts from 33⅓ series about the making of the album.

Reception

Donuts was released to universal acclaim from music critics. The album holds a score of 84 out of 100 on the review aggregate site Metacritic, indicating "universal acclaim". Will Dukes of Pitchfork wrote that Donuts showcases Dilla paying homage to "the selfsame sounds he's modernized", and in that sense, the album "is pure postmodern art—which was hip-hop's aim in the first place." PopMatters Michael Frauenhofer described Donuts as an "album of explosions and restraint, of precisely crafted balances and absurd breakdowns, of the senselessly affecting juxtaposition of the most powerful of dreams." The A.V. Clubs Nathan Rabin noted Dilla's "ability to twist and contort samples into unrecognizable new forms" and concluded that "as an album from one of rap's most revered producers on one of hip-hop's most respected labels, Donuts would qualify as a fairly major release under any circumstances, but J Dilla's recent death lends it additional significance and gravity." Andy Kellman of AllMusic wrote that Donuts "has a resonance deeper than anyone could've hoped for or even imagined" given Dilla's passing shortly after its release, and ultimately "just might be the one release that best reflects his personality". Giving it a three-star honorable mention rating in his review for MSN Music, Robert Christgau called Donuts "more about moments than flow, which is strange when you think about it".

In a 2007 guest column for Pitchfork, Panda Bear of Animal Collective stated that Donuts was "By far the album I've listened to most over the past year, and I feel like almost any of the songs off there I could say is my favorite." Online music service Rhapsody ranked the album at number three on its "Hip-Hop's Best Albums of the Decade" list. It ranked number nine on Clashs Essential 50 countdown in April 2009, and the magazine later wrote that its "legacy is undeniable". In a 2012 review of the Donuts 45 box set, Pitchfork accorded the album a revised 10/10 rating, with critic Nate Patrin writing: "It's a widely praised favorite for so many people, and yet there's something about Donuts that feels like such an intensely personal statement". Q, in 2017, called it a "tour de force in postmodern beatmaking".

Further track appearances
Many rappers have performed over instrumentals from Donuts, both on official and unofficial releases. The tracks "One for Ghost" and "Hi" were used in Ghostface Killah's Fishscale, under the names "Whip You With a Strap" and "Beauty Jackson", respectively. Ghostface Killah also used "Geek Down" for the song "Murda Goons", released on his Hidden Darts: Special Edition album. J Dilla's posthumously released album The Shining, also released with new verses on Common's Finding Forever, uses a re-edited version of "Bye.” After Dilla's passing, The Roots used "Time: The Donut of the Heart" for their J Dilla tribute "Can't Stop This" on the album Game Theory. In 2005, the track "Mash" was rapped over by MF DOOM and Guilty Simpson on the track "Mash's Revenge", which appears on the Stones Throw compilation "B-Ball Zombie War". DOOM also used "Anti-American Graffiti", which appeared on the Dilla Ghost Doom release Sniperlite, as well as "Lightworks" on a track of the same name on his album Born Like This. Other rappers that have used Donuts instrumentals on mixtape and non-album releases include Drake, Nas, Talib Kweli, Jay Electronica, Big Sean, Big Pooh, Charles Hamilton, and Lupe Fiasco.

Cartoon Network has used many of the album's tracks as bumper music during the Adult Swim programming block. Adult Swim, which has been in a partnership with Stones Throw records, cited the track "Stepson of the Clapper" as a favorite. In 2017, Dave Chappelle used "Workinonit" as the theme music for his two Netflix stand-up specials.

Track listing

Personnel
Credits are adapted from the album's liner notes.

 J Dilla – producer
 Peanut Butter Wolf – executive producer
 Dave Cooley – mastering
 Jeff Jank – design
 Andrew Gura – photography

Sample creditsDonuts (Outro)"Stay with Me" by Gary DavisWorkinonit"The Worst Band in the World" by 10cc
"King of the Beats" by Mantronix
"The New Style" by The Beastie Boys
"Six Figures" by Skillz and Ras Kass
"Pee-Wee's Dance" by Joeski Love
"Buffalo Gals" by Malcolm McLaren
"Sprite: Melonball Bounce" by Raymond Scott
"Yes It's You" by "Sweet" Charles SherrellWaves"Johnny, Don't Do It" by 10cc
"King of the Beats" by Mantronix
"Intro" by B.R. GunnaLight My Fire"Light My Fire" by Africa
"My Thang" by James BrownThe New"What'cha Gonna Wear Tomorrow" by The Detroit Emeralds
"The New Style" by The Beastie BoysStop!"You're Gonna Need Me" by Dionne Warwick
"Why?" by Jadakiss
"Six Figures" by Skillz and Ras KassPeople"My People... Hold On" by Eddie Kendricks
"King of the Beats" by Mantronix
"Mujhe Maar Daalo" by Asha Bhosle and Laxmikant-Pyarelal
"Here We Go (Live at the Funhouse)" by Run-D.M.C.The Diff'rence"The Fruitman" by Kool & the Gang
"King of the Beats" by Mantronix
"Jungle Boogie" by Kool & the Gang
"Six Figures" by Skillz and Ras KassMash"Golden Apples Pt. 2" by Galt MacDermot
"Season of the Witch" by Lou Rawls
"Dance Contest" by Frank ZappaTime: The Donut of the Heart"All I Do Is Think of You" by The Jackson 5
"Yes It's You" by "Sweet" Charles Sherrell
"Strangers in the Night" by "Sweet" Charles SherrellGlazed"You Just Can't Win (By Making the Same Mistake)" by Gene Chandler and Jerry Butler
"Dreams" by Ramsey Lewis
"Ball of Confusion (That's What the World Is Today)" by Edwin Starr
"Season of the Witch" by Lou RawlsAirworks"I Don't Really Care" by L.V. JohnsonLightworks"Lightworks" by Raymond Scott
"King of the Beats" by Mantronix
"Bendix 1: The Tomorrow People" by Raymond Scott
"Six Figures" by Skillz and Ras KassStepson of the Clapper"Long Red (Live)" by MountainThe Twister (Huh, What)"Kick the Can (Part 1)" by Fred Frith
"Cloud Nine (Live)" by The Temptations
"For Once in My Life (Live)" by Stevie Wonder
"Buffalo Gals" by Malcolm McLaren
"His Name Is Mutty Ranks" by A Tribe Called Quest
"Pee-Wee's Dance" by Joeski LoveOne Eleven"A Legend in Its Own Time" by Smokey Robinson and The Miracles
"Here We Go (Live at the Funhouse)" by Run-D.M.C.
"King Tim III (Personality Jock)" by The Fatback BandTwo Can Win"Only One Can Win" by The SylversDon't Cry"I Can't Stand (to See You Cry)" by The Escorts
"Comedy Routine: Hello, Young Lovers / Cloud Nine / If I Didn't Care" by The TemptationsAnti-American Graffiti"Family Tree" by Tin Tin
"Pee-Wee's Dance" by Joeski Love
"Emergency Program Over-Ride" by David OssmanGeek Down"Charlie's Theme" by The Jimi Entley Sound
"UFO" by ESGThunder"Sweet Misery" by Martha Reeves
"King of the Beats" by Mantronix
"Who's Making Love (Live)" by Bobby Taylor
"I Can't Turn You Loose (Live)" by Blinky
"For Once in My Life (Live)" by Stevie Wonder
"Sing a Simple Song (Live)" by The OriginalsGobstopper"To the Other Man" by Luther Ingram
"King of the Beats" by MantronixOne for Ghost"To the Other Man" by Luther Ingram
"King of the Beats" by MantronixDilla Says Go"Rubber Bands" by The Trammps
"Do Ya Thing" by B.R. Gunna
"No Games" by Jaylib
"Intro" by B.R. GunnaWalkinonit"Walk on By" by The Undisputed Truth
"Six Figures" by Skillz and Ras KassThe Factory"Animosity" by Fred Weinberg
"King of the Beats" by Mantronix
"Mean Old Devil" by Bruce HaackU-Love"Just Because I Really Love You" by Jerry Butler
"Do Ya Thing" by B.R. Gunna
"Intro" by B.R. GunnaHi."Maybe" by The Three DegreesBye."Don't Say Goodnight (It's Time for Love) (Parts 1 and 2)" by The Isley BrothersLast Donut of the Night"To You with Love" by The Moments
"Rainbow '65" by Gene ChandlerWelcome to the Show'''''
"When I Die" by Motherlode
"Stay with Me" by Gary Davis

Charts

See also
Hip hop production
Sampling (music)
Sound collage

References

Works cited

External links
 
Official website
Official YouTube playlist

2006 albums
J Dilla albums
Stones Throw Records albums
Albums produced by J Dilla
Instrumental hip hop albums
Plunderphonics albums